A digital public square (DPS) is a user-driven website that relies upon user-generated content (UGC), created by a group of people with a common interest in a specific community. At its most basic, a digital public square represents an evolution in how people discover, read and share news, information and content.  Users/content providers share the common goal of informing and becoming more informed about a shared geographic community or a community of ideas.

Modeled after the traditional “public square” where townspeople would gather to exchange views, a digital public square provides a virtual platform for the exploration of issues and the sharing of ideas, creativity and opinions while developing solutions to a community's challenges.  A thriving digital public square has a rich content stream that may include video footage of community events and an interactive community record of nonprofit news and resources. The DPS offers a platform for dialogue and encourages people to connect in a virtual setting to establish relationships that can effect social change.

History 

The term “digital public square” was originally coined by the Community Foundation for Palm Beach and Martin Counties during the development of yourPBC.org.  The site was created as a digital public square project for Palm Beach County, Florida, and was funded by a Civic Initiatives Leadership Grant from the John S. and James L. Knight Foundation.

Structure 

A digital public square is characterized by user-generated content, which may include featured discussions of topics of community interest; comments, ratings, multimedia, news articles, community news and events; an events calendar with community events and volunteer opportunities; and a resource center with published research and articles, community resources, and an extensive directory of social services.

Examples  

yourPBC digital public square created by the Community Foundation for Palm Beach and Martin Counties, Inc.
Tallahassee, FL digital public square project
Coral Gables, FL digital public square project
District of Columbia Digital Public Square

See also
 Web 2.0

References

Citizen media
Collective intelligence
Social networking websites
Virtual communities